Eyes of Things (EoT) is the name of a project funded by the European Union’s Horizon 2020 Research and Innovation Programme under grant agreement number 643924. The purpose of the project, which is funded under the Smart Cyber-physical systems topic, is to develop a generic hardware-software platform for embedded, efficient (i.e. battery-operated, wearable, mobile), computer vision, including deep learning inference.

On November 29, 2018, the European Space Agency announced that it was testing the suitability of the device for space applications in advance of a flight in a Cubesat.

Motivation
EoT is based on the following tenets:
 Future embedded systems will have more intelligence and cognitive functionality. Vision is paramount to such intelligent capacity
 Unlike other sensors, vision requires intensive processing. Power consumption must be optimized if vision is to be used in mobile and wearable applications
 Cloud processing of edge-captured images is not sustainable. The sheer amount of visual data generated cannot be transferred to the cloud. Bandwidth is not sufficient and cloud servers cannot cope with it.

Partners
VISILAB group at University of Castilla–La Mancha (Coordinator)
 Movidius 
 Awaiba 
 Thales Security Solutions & Systems 
 DFKI 
 Fluxguide
 Evercam 
 nVISO

Awards 

 2019 Electronic Component and Systems Innovation Award by the European Commission
 2018 HiPEAC Tech Transfer Award 
 2018 EC Innovation Radar - highlighting excellent innovations Award
 2018 Internet of Things (IoT) Technology Research Award Pilot by Google
 2016 Semifinalist "THE VISION SHOW STARTUP COMPETITION", Global Association for Vision Information, Boston US

See also
 Wearable camera
 Computer vision
 Internet of Things
 Embedded systems
 Edge computing

References

Computer vision